Peyerimhoff is a surname. It may refer to:

 Henri de Peyerimhoff (entomologist) (1838–1877), French magistrate and entomologist
 Henri de Peyerimhoff (1871–1953), French civil servant and industrialist
 Paul de Peyerimhoff de Fontenelle (1873–1957), French naturalist, botanist, entomologist, and zoologist
 Sigrid D. Peyerimhoff  (born 1937), German theoretical chemist